Faratsiho is a town in Vakinankaratra Region, Madagascar. It is the capitol of the district of Faratsiho The district covers an area of 2,015 km2, with a total population estimated at 222,922 in 2018. The seat of the district administration is the town of Faratsiho.

Communes
The district is further divided into nine communes:

 Ambohiborona
 Andranomiady
 Antsapanimahazo
 Faratsiho
 Miandrarivo
 Ramainandro
 Valabetokana
 Vinaninony-Atsimo
 Vinaninony Nord

Roads
The district and the town is crossed by the National road 43.

References

Districts of Vakinankaratra